Claus Wellenreuther (born 1935) is a German entrepreneur and the co-founder of the software company SAP SE.

Career 
Wellenreuther was born in Mannheim and studied business administration at University of Mannheim with a specialization in operations research.

He submitted his dissertation on Markov processes and their implementation on queueing systems in 1968. Afterwards Wellenreuther worked at IBM in Mannheim, where he was responsible for developing financial accountancy systems. In 1971 he left IBM to program a  standard financial accountancy system with batch processing. He then joined his former IBM colleagues Hasso Plattner, Dietmar Hopp, Hans-Werner Hector and Klaus Tschira to found the software company Systeme, Anwendungen und Produkte in der Datenverarbeitung in Weinheim, which would later become the SAP AG. Wellenreuther was primarily responsible for the architecture and the concept of the SAP R/2 financial accountancy module.

Wellenreuther left the business in 1980 for health reasons and received a compensation of 1 million DM.

In 1982 he founded DCW Software (Dr. Claus Wellenreuther GmbH & Co. KG), which he developed into a specialist for middle-sized ERP software. The company was acquired by SAP in 2003. The "deal among friends" was heavily criticized by DCW customers that had explicitly decided for an alternative to SAP. In 2004 DCW was merged with the SAP subsidiary Steeb Anwendungssysteme GmbH.

References

External links 
Picture of Claus Wellenreuther

1935 births
Businesspeople in software
German company founders
20th-century German businesspeople
21st-century German businesspeople
Living people
Businesspeople from Mannheim
SAP SE people
University of Mannheim alumni